Jeļena Blaževiča (born 11 May 1970 in Riga) is a retired Latvian triple jumper. Her personal best jump was 14.55 metres, achieved in June 1996 in Riga.

Achievements

References

External links
 
 
 

1970 births
Living people
Latvian female triple jumpers
Olympic athletes of Latvia
Athletes (track and field) at the 1996 Summer Olympics
University of Latvia alumni